Jacqueline V. "Jackie" Loughery (sometimes credited as Evelyn Avery, is a retired American actress and former beauty pageant titleholder who was crowned "Miss Rockaway Point" in 1949 before becoming crowned Miss New York USA 1952 and later, was the first-ever winner of the Miss USA competition (Miss USA 1952).

Early life
Loughery was born and raised in Flatbush, Brooklyn, New York, the daughter of Joseph and Ellen Loughery. She attended St. Francis Xavier Academy for Young Ladies.

Career

Miss USA 
In 1952, Loughery won the Miss USA title after a second ballot broke a first-place tie. Loughery, a redhead, went on to represent the US at the first Miss Universe pageant, where she placed ninth.

Entertainment 
Loughery appeared in several films, including the 1956 comedy Pardners with Martin and Lewis and the 1957 drama The D.I., with Jack Webb, whom she married in 1958.

In 1951, Loughery appeared in the short-lived variety show Seven at Eleven. In 1954, she was Johnny Carson's assistant in the short lived game show Earn Your Vacation.

In 1956, she co-starred with Edgar Buchanan and Jack Buetel in the syndicated western television series Judge Roy Bean, as Judge Bean's niece, Letty.
  
In 1957–58, she made five guest appearances on The George Burns and Gracie Allen Show; three as "Joyce Collins" and the other two as "Vicki Donovan". In 1963, she appeared on Perry Mason as murderer Nell Grimes, the title character, in "The Case of the Bigamous Spouse." She appeared as Martha, sister of Sheriff Sam Phelps in the May 18, 1961 episode of the series Bat Masterson, "Farmer with a Badge".

She was featured in the film Eighteen and Anxious (1957) and top-billed in The Hot Angel (1958).

Personal life

In October 1952, aged 23, Loughery married Guy Mitchell, a singer. After that marriage ended, she wed, in July 1958, actor/producer Jack Webb. (A 1964 newspaper brief reported that Loughery and Webb were wed June 24, 1958 in Studio City.) Loughery divorced Webb in March 1964. She married Jack W. Schwietzer in 1969, and they remained married until his death in 2009. In December 2022, she was featured in Western Clippings where she discussed her onscreen career.

Filmography

References

External links

 
 Jackie Loughery pictures at allstarpics.net
 Jacqueline V. Loughery

American film actresses
American television actresses
Living people
Miss Universe 1952 contestants
Miss USA 1950s delegates
Miss USA winners
People from Flatbush, Brooklyn
20th-century American people
21st-century American women
Year of birth missing (living people)